Roman Holiday is a 1953 American romantic comedy film directed and produced by William Wyler. It stars Audrey Hepburn as a princess out to see Rome on her own and Gregory Peck as a reporter. Hepburn won an Academy Award for Best Actress for her performance; the screenplay and costume design also won.

The script was written by John Dighton and Dalton Trumbo, though with Trumbo on the Hollywood blacklist, he did not receive a credit, and Ian McLellan Hunter fronted for him. Trumbo's credit was reinstated when the film was released on DVD in 2003. On December 19, 2011, full credit for Trumbo's work was restored. Blacklisted director Bernard Vorhaus worked on the film as an assistant director under a pseudonym.

The film was shot at the Cinecittà studios and on location around Rome during the "Hollywood on the Tiber" era. The film was screened in the 14th Venice Film Festival within the official program.

In 1999, Roman Holiday was selected for preservation in the United States National Film Registry by the Library of Congress as being "culturally, historically, or aesthetically significant". The film has been considered one of the most romantic films in cinema history.

Plot
Crown princess Ann is on a tightly scheduled tour of European capital cities to promote goodwill and improve trade relations for her unnamed nation. After an especially hard day in Rome her doctor gives her an injection and advises her: "Best thing I know is to do exactly what you wish for a while." When she is left alone she secretly leaves her bedroom and country's embassy to witness city life. The effect of the drug then sets in, and she ends up happily lying on a stone bench. Joe Bradley, an expatriate reporter for the "American News Service", finds her there without recognizing who she is. He thinks she is intoxicated and, feeling protective, he takes her to his apartment to sleep it off.

The next morning, Joe hurries off late to work and gives his editor, Mr. Hennessy, false details of his attendance at the princess's press conference. When Hennessy informs him that the event had been cancelled and shows him a news item about the princess's "sudden illness" with a picture of her in it, he realizes who is asleep in his apartment. Seeing an opportunity, Joe privately calls his photographer friend, Irving Radovich, to get him to secretly take pictures. Joe then tells Hennessy that he will get an exclusive wide-ranging interview with the princess and asks how much that would be worth. Hennessy offers to pay $5000, but bets Joe $500 that he will not be able to get it.

Joe hurries home and, hiding the fact that he is a reporter, offers to show "Anya" around Rome. However, Ann declines Joe's offer and leaves. Enjoying her freedom, she explores an outdoor market, buys a pair of shoes, observes the people and daily life of Rome, and gets her long hair cut short. Joe follows and "accidentally" meets Ann on the Spanish Steps. This time, he convinces her to spend the day with him, taking her to a street café where he meets up with Irving. When Anya tries to drive Joe on a Vespa through heavy Roman traffic they are all arrested, but Joe and Irving show their "fake" press passes and the group is set free. They visit the Mouth of Truth, where Joe tricks Ann into thinking that his hand has been bitten off, and later tour the Colosseum.

That night, at a dance on a boat that her barber had invited her to, government agents called in by the embassy spot Ann and try to forcibly take her away. Joe, Irving, and the barber rush in to save her from the abductors. Ann joins in the fight that breaks out. As police arrive and subdue the agents, Joe and Ann run away, but after Joe is ambushed and falls into the river, Ann jumps in to save him. They swim away from the dance and kiss as they sit shivering on the riverbank. Later at Joe's apartment, while drying their wet clothes, they share tender bittersweet moments. Regretfully bowing to her royal responsibilities, Ann asks Joe to drive her to a corner near the embassy, where they kiss again. She bids a tearful farewell and resumes her duties as a princess.

Joe decides not to write the story, although he tells Irving he is free to sell his photographs. Joe and Irving then leave to attend the postponed press conference at the embassy, much to Princess Ann's surprise. Joe assures Ann (in words she, but not the other reporters, will understand) that he will print nothing about their day together. At the end of the interview, the princess unexpectedly asks to meet the journalists, speaking briefly with each. As she reaches Joe and Irving, Irving presents her with his photographs as a memento of Rome. She and Joe share a few innocuous words together, before she reluctantly departs. After the rest of the press leave, Joe stays for awhile, then walks away alone.

Cast

Casting

Wyler first offered the role to Hollywood favorite Cary Grant. Grant declined, believing he was too old to play Hepburn's love interest, though he played opposite her ten years later in Charade. Other sources say Grant declined because he knew all of the attention would be centered around the princess. Peck's contract gave him solo star billing, with newcomer Hepburn listed much less prominently in the credits. Halfway through the filming, Peck suggested to Wyler that he elevate her to equal billing—an almost unheard-of gesture in Hollywood.

Wyler had initially considered Elizabeth Taylor and Jean Simmons for the princess' role, but both were unavailable. On 18 September 1951, director Thorold Dickinson made a screen test with Hepburn and sent it to director William Wyler, who was in Rome preparing Roman Holiday. Wyler wrote to Dickinson, saying that "as a result of the test, a number of the producers at Paramount have expressed interest in casting her." Roman Holiday was not Hepburn's first acting role, as she had appeared in Dutch and British films from 1948 and on stage, but it was her first major film role and her first appearance in an American film. Wyler wanted an "anti-Italian" actress who was different from the curvy Italian stars of that era: "She was perfect ... his new star had no arse, no tits, no tight-fitting clothes, no high heels. In short a Martian. She will be a sensation."

Filming locations

The Italian Ministry of Tourism had originally refused permission for the movie to be filmed in Rome, on the grounds that it would "degrade Italians". Once the matter was resolved, filming took place entirely in Rome and in the studios of Cinecittà. It was originally planned to be in color, but filming outside was so expensive that it had to be done in black and white. 
 Mouth of Truth, Piazza Bocca della Verità, Church of Santa Maria in Cosmedin
 Caffè Rocca, Piazza della Rotonda and Pantheon
 Castel Sant'Angelo
 Trevi Fountain
 Piazza Venezia
 Piazza di Spagna
 Trinità dei Monti
 Colosseum
 Tiber river
 Via Margutta 51, the location of Joe's apartment where he hosts Princess Ann
 Via dei Fori Imperiali
 Via della Stamperia 85, the barber shop where Ann has her hair cut
 Palazzo Colonna Gallery, shown in the final scenes of the princess's press appearance
 Palazzo Brancaccio, the princess' ornate Roman bedroom.

Reception
The film premiered at Radio City Music Hall in New York City on August 27, 1953, grossing $165,000 in its first week. The film also opened the same week in two theatres in Portland, Oregon on a double bill with Murder Without Tears, grossing $14,000.

The film was met with critical acclaim, and is now considered a classic. Milton Luban of The Hollywood Reporter said the movie "proves a charming, laugh-provoking affair that often explodes into hilarity....it has a "delightful screenplay that sparkles with wit and outrageous humor that at times comes close to slapstick" and that the "cinematographers do a fine job of incorporating Roman landmarks into the storyline." The New York Times observed that it was "a natural, tender and amusing yarn" with "laughs that leave the spirits soaring." Peter Bradshaw of The Guardian noted that the film was a “ modern fairytale whose two leads have a charm and innocence that irradiate the whole movie”, giving the film 5 stars. Empire concluded that the film was a “Timeless, exuberant classic, with Hepburn's naïve sense of fun and perfectly charming performance matched equally by Peck's lauche and charismatic worldy American.” James Berardinelli of reelviews gave the film 3.5/4 stars, calling the movie a “staple of the romantic comedy fan’s library”, and “ remains one of only a few black-and-white movies that modern audiences willingly watch”.

Roman Holiday was the second most popular film at the US box office during September 1953 behind From Here to Eternity, grossing almost $1 million. It earned an estimated $3 million at the United States and Canadian box office during its first few months of release. While the domestic box office disappointed Paramount, it was very successful elsewhere, including the UK, where the film benefited from both the concurrent romance between Princess Margaret and commoner Peter Townsend—"No film studio could have bought such publicity", Alexander Walker wrote—and a fad for Italian culture.

Due to the film's popularity, both Peck and Hepburn were approached about filming a sequel, but this project never got off the ground.

The film has been very well received, with a 95% "Certified fresh" rating at Rotten Tomatoes based on 63 reviews with an average rating of 8.50/10. The website's critical consensus reads: "With Audrey Hepburn luminous in her American debut, Roman Holiday is as funny as it is beautiful, and sets the standard for the modern romantic comedy."

Awards and nominations

The Academy Award for Best Story was initially given to Ian McLellan Hunter, since he took story credit on behalf of Dalton Trumbo (who was blacklisted). The Academy of Motion Picture Arts and Sciences later credited the win to Trumbo, and in 1993 Trumbo's widow, Cleo, received her late husband's Oscar.

In 1999, Roman Holiday was selected for preservation in the United States National Film Registry by the Library of Congress as being "culturally, historically, or aesthetically significant".

The American Film Institute lists the film at No. 4 in its AFI's 100 Years...100 Passions, and at No. 4 in the romantic comedy category in its AFI's 10 Top 10.

Adaptations
The film was remade for television in 1987 with Tom Conti and Catherine Oxenberg, who is herself a member of a European royal family.
An unofficial Tamil-language adaptation, titled May Madham, was released in 1994. The 1991 Malayalam movie Kilukkam was also reported to be based on this movie.

The 1999 Richard Curtis film Notting Hill has been likened to "a 90's London-set version of Roman Holiday". There are a number of allusions to it in the film, in which the princess character is replaced with "Hollywood royalty" and the commoner is a British bookshop owner.

Paramount Pictures has since licensed three adaptations of Roman Holiday into musicals:

 In 2012, the Guthrie Theater of Minneapolis presented a musical stage version, following the plot using the songs of Cole Porter with a book adaptation was by Paul Blake (Beautiful: The Carole King Story). It was scheduled for a run in San Francisco in summer 2017 before going on to Broadway.
 The Teatro Sistina staged another version in 2004 in Rome under the title Vacanze Romane using the Cole Porter score, supplemented with music by Italian film composer Armando Trovajoli. This production is annually performed in Rome and on tour in Italy and Spain.
 Toho [Japanese Theatre Company] produced a version entirely in Japanese with a completely different score in 1998.

See also 

 Basta't Kasama Kita, a 1995 Philippine film with a similar plot
 Touch Your Heart (Korean: 진심이 닿다; RR: Jinsim-i Data; lit. Reach of Sincerity), a 2019 Korean television series in which the protagonists are a celebrated actress who goes to work at a law firm to prepare for her comeback role in a legal drama and the lawyer she works for, with whom she falls in love. There are multiple references to Roman Holiday in the series, including a scene where the lawyer rents a movie theater so the couple can watch the film together out of sight of the press.

References

External links 

 
 
 
 
 
 

1953 films
1953 romantic comedy films
1950s American films
1950s English-language films
American black-and-white films
American romantic comedy films
Fictional princesses
Films about journalists
Films about princesses
Films about royalty
Films directed by William Wyler
Films featuring a Best Actress Academy Award-winning performance
Films featuring a Best Drama Actress Golden Globe-winning performance
Films scored by Georges Auric
Films set in Rome
Films shot in Rome
Films that won the Academy Award for Best Story
Films that won the Best Costume Design Academy Award
Films with screenplays by Dalton Trumbo
Paramount Pictures films
United States National Film Registry films
Films about interclass romance